Mistletoe is the common name for obligate hemiparasitic plants in the order Santalales. They are attached to their host tree or shrub by a structure called the haustorium, through which they extract water and nutrients from the host plant.

The name mistletoe originally referred to the species Viscum album (European mistletoe, of the family Santalaceae in the order Santalales); it is the only species native to the British Isles and much of Europe.  A related species with red rather than white fruits, Viscum cruciatum, occurs in Southwest Spain and Southern Portugal, as well as in Morocco in North Africa and in southern Africa. The genus Viscum is not native to North America, but Viscum album was introduced to Northern California in 1900.

The eastern mistletoe native to North America, Phoradendron leucarpum, belongs to a distinct genus of the family Santalaceae. 

European mistletoe has smooth-edged, oval, evergreen leaves borne in pairs along the woody stem, and waxy, white berries that it bears in clusters of two to six. The eastern mistletoe of North America is similar, but has shorter, broader leaves and longer clusters of 10 or more berries.

Over the centuries, the term has been broadened to include many other species of parasitic plants with similar habits, found in other parts of the world, that are classified in different genera and families such as the Misodendraceae of South America and the mainly southern hemisphere tropical Loranthaceae.

Etymology
The word 'mistletoe' derives from the older form 'mistle' adding the Old English word  (twig).  'Mistle' is common Germanic (Old High German , Middle High German , Old English , Old Norse ).  Further etymology is uncertain, but may be related to the Germanic base for 'mash'.

Groups
Parasitism has evolved at least twelve times among the vascular plants. Molecular data show the mistletoe habit has evolved independently five times within the Santalales—first in the Misodendraceae, but also in the Loranthaceae and three times in the Santalaceae (in the former Santalalean families Eremolepidaceae and Viscaceae, and the tribe Amphorogyneae).

The largest family of mistletoes, the Loranthaceae, has 73 genera and over 900 species. Subtropical and tropical climates have markedly more mistletoe species; Australia has 85, of which 71 are in Loranthaceae, and 14 in Santalaceae.

Life cycle
Mistletoe species grow on a wide range of host trees, some of which experience side effects including reduced growth, stunting, and loss of infested outer branches. A heavy infestation may also kill the host plant. Viscum album successfully parasitizes more than 200 tree and shrub species.

All mistletoe species are hemiparasites because they do perform some photosynthesis for some period of their life cycle. However, in some species its contribution is very nearly zero. For example, some species, such as Viscum minimum, that parasitize succulents, commonly species of Cactaceae or Euphorbiaceae, grow largely within the host plant, with hardly more than the flower and fruit emerging. Once they have germinated and attached to the circulatory system of the host, their photosynthesis reduces so far that it becomes insignificant.

Most of the Viscaceae bear evergreen leaves that photosynthesise effectively, and photosynthesis proceeds within their green, fleshy stems as well. Some species, such as Viscum capense, are adapted to semi-arid conditions and their leaves are vestigial scales, hardly visible without detailed morphological investigation. Therefore, their photosynthesis and transpiration only take place in their stems, limiting their demands on the host's supply of water, but also limiting their intake of carbon dioxide for photosynthesis. Accordingly, their contribution to the host's metabolic balance becomes trivial and the idle parasite may become quite yellow as it grows, having practically given up photosynthesis.

At another extreme other species have vigorous green leaves. Not only do they photosynthesize actively, but a heavy infestation of mistletoe plants may take over whole host tree branches, sometimes killing practically the entire crown and replacing it with their own growth. In such a tree the host is relegated purely to the supply of water and mineral nutrients and the physical support of the trunk. Such a tree may survive as a Viscum community for years; it resembles a totally unknown species unless one examines it closely, because its foliage does not look like that of any tree. An example of a species that behaves in this manner is Viscum continuum.

A mistletoe seed germinates on the branch of a host tree or shrub, and in its early stages of development it is independent of its host. It commonly has two or even four embryos, each producing its hypocotyl, that grows towards the bark of the host under the influence of light and gravity, and potentially each forming a mistletoe plant in a clump. Possibly as an adaptation to assist in guiding the process of growing away from the light, the adhesive on the seed tends to darken the bark. On having made contact with the bark, the hypocotyl, with only a rudimentary scrap of root tissue at its tip, penetrates it, a process that may take a year or more. In the meantime the plant is dependent on its own photosynthesis. Only after it reaches the host's conductive tissue can it begin to rely on the host for its needs. Later it forms a haustorium that penetrates the host tissue and takes water and nutrients from the host plant.

Species more or less obligate include the leafless quintral, Tristerix aphyllus, which lives deep inside the sugar-transporting tissue of a spiny cactus, appearing only to show its tubular red flowers, and the genus  Arceuthobium (dwarf mistletoe; Santalaceae) which has reduced photosynthesis; as an adult, it manufactures only a small proportion of the sugars it needs from its own photosynthesis, but as a seedling actively photosynthesizes until a connection to the host is established.

Some species of the largest family, Loranthaceae, have small, insect-pollinated flowers (as with Santalaceae), but others have spectacularly showy, large, bird-pollinated flowers.

Most mistletoe seeds are spread by birds that eat the 'seeds' (in actuality drupes). Of the many bird species that feed on them, the mistle thrush is the best-known in Europe, the Phainopepla in southwestern North America, and Dicaeum of Asia and Australia. Depending on the species of mistletoe and the species of bird, the seeds are regurgitated from the crop, excreted in their droppings, or stuck to the bill, from which the bird wipes it onto a suitable branch. The seeds are coated with a sticky material called viscin. Some viscin remains on the seed and when it touches a stem, it sticks tenaciously. The viscin soon hardens and attaches the seed firmly to its future host, where it germinates and its haustorium penetrates the sound bark.

Specialist mistletoe eaters have adaptations that expedite the process; some pass the seeds through their unusually shaped digestive tracts so fast that a pause for defecation of the seeds is part of the feeding routine. Others have adapted patterns of feeding behavior; the bird grips the fruit in its bill and squeezes the sticky-coated seed out to the side. The seed sticks to the beak and the bird wipes it off onto the branch.

Biochemically, viscin is a complex adhesive mix containing cellulosic strands and mucopolysaccharides.

Once a mistletoe plant is established on its host, it usually is possible to save a valuable branch by pruning and judicious removal of the wood invaded by the haustorium, if the infection is caught early enough. Some species of mistletoe can regenerate if the pruning leaves any of the haustorium alive in the wood.

Toxicity
There are 1500 species of mistletoe, varying widely in toxicity to humans; the European mistletoe (Viscum album) is more toxic than the American mistletoe (Phoradendron serotinum), though concerns regarding toxicity are more prevalent in the US. The effects are not usually fatal. In parts of South Asia, they are frequently used as an external medicine. The active substances are Phoratoxin (in Phoradendron) and Tyramine (in Viscum) and their effects include blurred vision, diarrhoea, nausea and vomiting. Less commonly they cause cardiac problems; seizures, hypertension, and even cardiac arrest. Toxins are more concentrated in the leaves and berries of the plant, with teas prepared from the plant being particularly dangerous. While adults may suffer little effect, these are more pronounced in small children and in animals.

Mistletoe has been used historically in medicine for its supposed value in treating arthritis, high blood pressure, epilepsy and infertility.

Ecological importance
Mistletoes are often considered pests that kill trees and devalue natural habitats, but some species have recently been recognized as ecological keystone species, organisms that have a disproportionately pervasive influence over their community. A broad array of animals depend on mistletoe for food, consuming the leaves and young shoots, transferring pollen between plants and dispersing the sticky seeds. In western North America their juicy berries are eaten and spread by birds (notably Phainopepla, or silky-flycatcher) while in Australia the mistletoebird behaves similarly. When eaten, some seeds pass unharmed through their digestive systems; if the birds’ droppings happen to land on a suitable branch, the seeds may stick long enough to germinate. As the plants mature, they grow into masses of branching stems which suggest the popular name "witches’ brooms".

The dense evergreen witches' brooms formed by the dwarf mistletoes (Arceuthobium species) of western North America also make excellent locations for roosting and nesting of the northern spotted owl and the marbled murrelet. In Australia the diamond firetail and painted honeyeater are recorded as nesting in different mistletoes.

A study of mistletoe in junipers concluded that more juniper berries sprout in stands where mistletoe is present, as the mistletoe attracts berry-eating birds which also eat juniper berries.

Cultural importance

Mistletoe is relevant to several cultures. Pagan cultures regarded the white berries as symbols of male fertility, with the seeds resembling semen. The Celts, particularly, saw mistletoe as the semen of Taranis, while the Ancient Greeks referred to mistletoe as "oak sperm". Also in Roman mythology, mistletoe was used by the hero Aeneas to reach the underworld.

Mistletoe may have played an important role in Druidic mythology in the Ritual of Oak and Mistletoe, although the only ancient writer to mention the use of mistletoe in this ceremony was Pliny. Evidence taken from bog bodies makes the Celtic use of mistletoe seem medicinal rather than ritual. It is possible that mistletoe was originally associated with human sacrifice and only became associated with the white bull after the Romans banned human sacrifices.

The Romans associated mistletoe with peace, love and understanding and hung it over doorways to protect the household. 

In the Christian era, mistletoe in the Western world became associated with Christmas as a decoration under which lovers are expected to kiss, as well as with protection from witches and demons. Mistletoe continued to be associated with fertility and vitality through the Middle Ages, and by the 18th century it had also become incorporated into Christmas celebrations around the world. The custom of kissing under the mistletoe is referred to as popular among servants in late 18th-century England. 

The serving class of Victorian England is credited with perpetuating the tradition. The tradition dictated that a man was allowed to kiss any woman standing underneath mistletoe, and that bad luck would befall any woman who refused the kiss. One variation on the tradition stated that with each kiss a berry was to be plucked from the mistletoe, and the kissing must stop after all the berries had been removed. People have reportedly been poisoned and died from consuming mistletoe.

From at least the mid-19th century, Caribbean herbalists of African descent have referred to mistletoe as "god-bush". In Nepal, diverse mistletoes are used for a variety of medical purposes, particularly for treating broken bones.

Mistletoe is the floral emblem of the US state of Oklahoma and the flower of the UK county of Herefordshire. Every year, the UK town of Tenbury Wells holds a mistletoe festival and crowns a 'Mistletoe Queen'.

One of the earliest references to mistletoe traditions in popular music is the 1952 hit "I Saw Mommy Kissing Santa Claus", which was originally sung by Jimmy Boyd and has been covered by many singers. The song was written by British songwriter Tommie Connor and recorded in the US. The 1958 US hit "Rockin' Around The Christmas Tree" refers to couples wanting to stop beneath the mistletoe. "Ring Out, Solstice Bells" from the album Songs from the Wood (1977) by British rock group Jethro Tull refers to the Druid Ritual of Oak and Mistletoe. In 1988, the British singer Cliff Richard released a popular Christmas song called "Mistletoe and Wine". More recent Christmas songs referring to mistletoe traditions include "Merry Christmas Everyone" by Shakin' Stevens (1991), "All I Want For Christmas Is You" written and performed by Mariah Carey (1994), “Underneath the Mistletoe” written and performed by Sia (2017), and "Mistletoe" by Justin Bieber (2011).

See also
 Festive ecology
 Kissing bough
 Viscum album

References

External links

 Parasitic Plant Connection. See families Misodendraceae, Loranthaceae, Santalaceae, and Viscaceae
 Introduction to Parasitic Flowering Plants by Nickrent & Musselman
 Phoradendron serotinum images at bioimages.vanderbilt.edu
 Scientific Studies, Research and Clinical Trials on Mistletoe Treatment in Cancer
 Deck the halls with wild, wonderful mistletoe, West Virginia Department of Agriculture
 
 
 ANBG: Mistletoe Accessed 22 January 2018.

Christmas plants
Medicinal plants
Parasitic plants
Santalales
Symbols of Oklahoma
Winter traditions
Plant common names